Florence Gravellier and Aniek Van Koot defeated Lucy Shuker and Daniela Di Toro in the final, 6–3, 7–6(7–2) to win the women's doubles wheelchair tennis title at the 2010 Australian Open.

Korie Homan and Esther Vergeer were the reigning champions, but Vergeer chose not compete. Homan partnered Jiske Griffioen, but withdrew before the semifinals.

Seeds

  Jiske Griffioen /  Korie Homan (semifinals, withdrew)
  Lucy Shuker /  Daniela Di Toro (final)

Draw

Finals

External links
 Main Draw

Wheelchair Women's Doubles
2010 Women's Doubles